Two ships of the Royal Navy have borne the name HMS Kale:

  was a  launched in 1904 and sunk by a mine in 1918.
  was a  launched in 1942 and sold in 1956.

Royal Navy ship names